Key Motorsports (formerly The Motorsports Group and Circle Sport – The Motorsports Group) was an American professional stock car racing team that last competed in the Monster Energy NASCAR Cup Series. The team was founded by Virginia businessman Curtis Key. The team is operated out of Mooresville, North Carolina. The team formerly competed in the NASCAR Xfinity Series and NASCAR Camping World Truck Series. In 2017, longtime team owner Joe Falk joined TMG, bringing his charter and No. 33 to the team, allowing the team to successfully make every race during the season. In December 2017, Circle Sport and TMG parted ways.

On June 21, 2018, The Motorsports Group announced they had changed their team name back to Key Motorsports. Soon afterwards, the team closed up their shop at the beginning of 2019.

Curtis Key
Curtis Key is an American businessman and plumber from Chesapeake, Virginia. Key owns a plumbing business in Chesapeake, Curtis Key Plumbing. He founded Key Motorsports in 1993 when he purchased a team owned by Tommy Ellis. Key Motorsports started out racing in the NASCAR Busch Series between 1993 and 1998. Between that period, Key Motorsports' best finish was a fifth place at Hickory Speedway in Key's first start as team owner, with driver Tommy Ellis. After a few more top tens, in 1998, Key closed the team following a family tragedy. After a decade away from the sport, in 2008, Key rebuilt Key Motorsports, later renaming it to The Motorsports Group in 2012. Between 2008 and 2014, TMG operated as a start and park team.

Monster Energy NASCAR Cup Series

Car No. 30 history

On September 15, 2014, the team announced they would begin fielding a full-time entry, the No. 30, in the Sprint Cup Series starting in 2015. On January 21, 2015, it was announced that Ron Hornaday Jr. would be the primary driver of the team's No. 30 car for the 2015 season. In the team's first attempt, Hornaday failed to qualify at the Daytona 500. The following week at Atlanta Motor Speedway, Hornaday made the race, but finished 42nd because of a broken gear after 182 laps. The team chose not to run the "West Coast Swing", enabling them to get better prepared for Martinsville Speedway. Unfortunately, Hornaday wrecked the car during the first round of qualifying at Martinsville and failed to make the race. After failing to qualify at Bristol Motor Speedway, Hornaday left and was replaced with Jeff Green starting at Richmond International Raceway Green drove same numbered 30 from 2001 to 2003. There, Green was able to make the field on speed, starting 33rd and finishing 40th. Green made the Sprint Showdown and finished 19th in a 29-car field. But failed to qualify in the follow weekend for the Coca-Cola 600 at Charlotte Motor Speedway and the FedEx 400 at Dover International Speedway. Green was later released by the team.

They returned to Kentucky with Travis Kvapil as their driver, but failed to qualify due to a rainout. They returned for Bristol as well, but again failed to qualify. They entered Darlington with Kvapil but failed to qualify again. At the September Richmond race, the team hired Josh Wise to run the car, but Wise could only muster 37th place in qualifying and thus missed the race. Kvapil returned at Chicagoland, but another rainout once again sent the team home. Wise was slated to return to New Hampshire, but was placed in BK Racing's No. 26 at the last minute and replaced by Kvapil, who once again failed to qualify. Kvapil was slated to attempt the second Dover race, but due to Hurricane Joaquin, the team chose to withdraw the day before qualifying. The team did not make an attempt for the remainder of 2015. Travis Kvapil left the team after the team temporarily suspended operations until the 2016 season.

Josh Wise rejoined the team in 2016. TMG and Wise announced that they expected to run the full season together. Wise didn't make the Daytona 500, but rebounded the next week, qualifying 38th of a 39-car field at Atlanta. Wise finished 39th after going down 13 laps but made it to the end of the race without any broken equipment. Because only 39 cars attempted the next 3 races, the No. 30 was guaranteed to qualify in Las Vegas, Phoenix, and Fontana with Josh Wise. After a long string of races in which Wise easily qualified the No. 30 TMG car in the races, including at Richmond when more than 40 cars showed up for the first time since Daytona, Wise missed his second race at the 2016 GEICO 500 when he qualified 41st out of a 40-car field. The team then qualified for every race until the Coke Zero 400 when Wise failed to qualify after running 40th of 41, behind the other non-chartered teams. This second streak included Wise managing to qualify at Sonoma, when 41 cars were entered for the first time since Talladega. The team qualified for the next two races, with Wise posting TMG's best finish with a 24th at Kentucky in July; he then missed the 2016 Brickyard 400 after posting the slowest speed of 41 cars in qualifying.

In the week leading up to the 2016 Bojangles' Southern 500, Wise and TMG got a two race sponsorship from Incredible Bank, an online banking system. The sponsor joined TMG after Wise posted a request for sponsorship on Twitter. The sponsorship allowed them to participate in the throwback weekend during the Southern 500 race weekend, with a throwback scheme honoring Dale Earnhardt's 1976 No. 30 Army car. Having failed to make 3 of the superspeedway races (and not entering the fall Talladega race, due to 43 cars entering), TMG didn't field the No. 30 for the 2016 Hellman's 500 but rebounded at Martinsville Speedway, this time with Gray Gaulding as the driver. Gaulding ran two more races at Phoenix and Homestead, failing to qualify at Homestead. Despite rumors that Gaulding would drive the No. 30 for TMG in 2017, plans changed due to the Circle Sport merger and Gaulding was picked up by BK Racing.

In January 2017, it was announced that TMG would partner with Key's lifelong friend Joe Falk and Circle Sport Racing to jointly field the Nos. 30 and 33 Chevrolets in the Monster Energy NASCAR Cup Series. This also meant that CS/TMG would partner with Richard Childress Racing as Falk's team is a satellite team of RCR. The team also formed an alliance with Hendrick Motorsports, who would provide CS/TMG with a pit crew and manager. However the No. 30 car did not run in 2017 as a part-time team even though people were expecting it to run at some point.

For the 2018 season, The Motorsports Group planned to run a No. 30 team, with Eddie Pardue as the crew chief, though the driver wasn't decided. The team never entered a single race in 2018, briefly renamed themselves back to Key Motorsports, and then shut down ahead of 2019.

Car No. 30 results

Car No. 33 history

On January 6, 2017, it was announced that longtime team owner Joe Falk would partner with Key and field a second car for TMG, bringing a charter and the No. 33 from Circle Sport Racing. It was announced that former TMG crew chief Pat Tryson would return to the team after being released by TMG in 2015.

It was announced on January 31 that Jeffrey Earnhardt would be the driver of the No. 33 Chevrolet for CS/TMG for the Daytona 500. Earnhardt brought sponsor Starter Clothing Line to the team. He finished 26th after being involved in a crash on lap 143. Veteran road course ringer Boris Said was hired to run the two road courses for the team at Sonoma and Watkins Glen, with these being his last two NASCAR starts. Before the 2017 Toyota/Save Mart 350, CS/TMG, again, released Tryson from the team and replaced him with veteran crew chief Frank Stoddard for specifically, Said's races. For the rest of the season, Eddie Pardue was the crew chief for the No. 33.

At the end of the season, Falk and Circle Sport parted ways with Key and TMG. With the split, this meant that Jeffrey Earnhardt was out of a ride, despite having signed an extension with CSTMG in October 2017.

Car No. 33 results

Xfinity Series

1993–1998
Key Motorsports was formed after it was purchased from Tommy Ellis in 1993 and debuted at the Miller 500 as the No. 05 Moen Faucets Chevrolet with Roger Sawyer driving. He qualified 14th and finished 22nd. Bobby Hamilton drove three races later at Dover International Speedway, where he finished 29th after suffering handling problems. He ran two additional races for Key later in the season, finishing 17th and 32nd, respectively. Ellis drove for Key in their final race of the year at Hickory Motor Speedway, and finished fifth. Randy MacDonald drove for two consecutive races for Key at the beginning of the following season, his best finish being 21st. Tommy Ellis returned to run a part-time schedule for Key. In nine starts, he had two top-ten finishes but failed to finish the other seven. Tom Peck finished out the season for Key, failing to finish both races due to engine failure.

Key Motorsports made its first race of 1995 at the Hardee's 250 with Steve Boley. They did not run until the fall Richmond race with Chuck Bown driving. After finishing 38th due to an engine failure, Bown finished ninth at the following race at Charlotte before suffering another engine failure at North Carolina Speedway. Bown returned to Key in 1996 at Richmond, where he finished in 31st place. Later in the season, Jeff Burton drove for Key at Charlotte, finishing 42nd with Exide Batteries sponsorship. In 1997, 19-year-old Jimmy Foster was hired to drive the No. 11 Outdoor Channel/Speedvision car, running ten races with a best finish of 16th at New Hampshire. He was released and replaced for a pair of races by Larry Pearson. After the season, a lack of funding coupled with a family tragedy forced Key to close his team.

Key Motorsports reopened in 2008.

Car No. 11 results

Car No. 31 history
Key Motorsports returned to the then Nationwide Series in 2008. Jeff Green took the wheel of the No. 31 Chevy for three races with a best finish of 28th.

Car No. 31 results

Car No. 40 history

In 2009, the team changed the number to No. 40 and signed Scott Wimmer as the primary driver. Wimmer ran 24 races for the team with a best finish of seventh in Memphis. During the races Wimmer spent with JR Motorsports, Green, Aric Almirola, Jeffrey Earnhardt, and Bliss drove the car.

For 2010, Bliss signed on as the driver of the car for the 2010 NASCAR Nationwide Series season. Bliss ran 31 races with a best finish of eighth at Bristol. Jeff Green drove four races for the team when Bliss drove for Kevin Harvick Incorporated with a best finish of 20th at Kentucky.

In 2011, Scott Wimmer started with the intention of running full-time for the No. 40 team. After 11 races and the best finish being 12th, Wimmer left since the team began starting and parking. Rookie of the year candidate Charles Lewandoski began driving the No. 40 after Wimmer left. Lewandoski had the best finish being 24th with the team while keeping them in the top 30 in owner's points to remain locked in.

For 2012, Josh Wise drove the car for the first two races before switching to the No. 42, to ensure Erik Darnell ran a full season.

In 2013, Reed Sorenson was scheduled the run the full schedule, but subbed for the injured Michael Annett in the Richard Petty Motorsports No. 43 until his return. Josh Wise ran the car for 5 races. Sorenson departed at season's end, moving to Tommy Baldwin Racing in the Sprint Cup Series.

In 2014, Wise returned to the No. 40, but left at mid-season to focus on his Sprint Cup obligations to Phil Parsons Racing. Matt DiBenedetto, previously driver of the start-and-park No. 46, moved over to the No. 40 at this time, running full races. DiBenedetto left for BK Racing at season's end, and the No. 40 was sold to MBM Motorsports due to the formation of TMG's own Cup team.

Car No. 40 results

Car No. 42 history
Key Motorsports began fielding the No. 42 at Michigan (race 15) as a third car for Tim Andrews. The team is another start and park operation like the No. 46 and No. 47. All three cars help fund the main car, the No. 40. Erik Darnell drove the car for the first two races until he switched with Josh Wise in order for Wise to run for Cup rookie honors and Darnell a full Nationwide season. Wise was replaced by Matt Frahm at Iowa and Tim Schendel and Road America.

In 2013, the No. 42 team returned with Wise, though J. J. Yeley drove the car until Wise returned from the No. 40. The team shut down after the season, and Wise moved to the No. 40.

Car No. 42 results

Car No. 46 history
Key Motorsports began fielding the No. 46 at Iowa (race 12) as a second car for Chase Miller. The team is another start and park operation like the No. 42 and No. 47. All three cars help fund the main car, the No. 40. Former Joe Gibbs Racing development driver Matt DiBenedetto drove the car at Dover. In 2013, the No. 46 team and Miller returned. Miller left after the season and DiBenedetto returned again in 2014, then moved to the No. 40 at mid-season. Matt Frahm, Wise, Josh Reaume, and Carl Long all took turns in the car after this, before Ryan Ellis closed out the year in the car. The No. 46 shut down after the season.

Car No. 46 results

Car No. 47 history
Key Motorsports began fielding the No. 47 at Kentucky (race 18) as a fourth car for Danny Efland and Scott Wimmer. Efland attempted Kentucky, but did not qualify. The team is another start and park operation like the No. 42 and No. 46. All three cars help fund the main car, the No. 40. The No. 47 was shared between Scott Speed and Brian Keselowski for 2011. For 2012, Speed drove the car for most of the races, being replaced by Tim Schendel at Iowa and Matt DiBenedetto at Michigan and Road America. In 2013 the team returned with Scott Riggs and Jason Bowles as drivers. The team attempted Texas, Richmond and Darlington and failed to qualify for all three.

Car No. 47 results

Camping World Truck Series

Truck No. 40 history

Key Motorsports returned to NASCAR competition in 2004 starting at the season-opening race at Daytona International Speedway. Joey Clanton drove for the first two races of the season in the No. 40 Optech Chevy, wrecking out of both of them. Tony Raines attempted the fall races at Richmond and Martinsville for Key, but did not qualify. Key did not race in 2005 until the summer Bristol race when Andy Houston drove the truck to a 33rd-place finish after a wreck. Their next attempt at Richmond resulted in a DNQ.

Chad Chaffin attempted the first six races of 2006, finishing eighteenth at Auto Club Speedway, and a 26th-place finish at Gateway. Beginning at the City of Mansfield 250, Dale Earnhardt, Inc. development driver Ryan Moore was named the team's new driver. He had three top-twenty finishes before resigning his position after the New Hampshire race. Tim Fedewa drove at Las Vegas followed by Derrike Cope at Talladega Superspeedway, who ran in the top-ten before becoming involved in a late crash. Shane Huffman finished out three of the final four races of 2006 for Key.

In 2007, Mike Bliss drove the first four races in the 40, posting a tenth-place finish at California. Clay Rogers and Huffman shared the ride for the rest of the half of the season, with Stacy Compton driving at Memphis. Brandon Miller drove for the next five races with Westerman Companies sponsoring, before Chaffin returned to finish out the season in the 40. Chaffin began the 2008 season in the No. 40, but was replaced by Jeff Green and Paul Poulter later in the year. Mike Bliss took over the No. 40 Chevy for ultimately a part-time schedule in 2009.

Truck No. 40 results

Truck No. 44 history

In 2007, Key debuted a new second truck, numbered 44 to run alongside the primary number 40. At Daytona, the truck was driven by Larry Foyt, who finished 32nd after an early accident. Morgan Shepherd piloted the truck for the next two races Auto Club and Atlanta, start and parking both times finishing 34th and 33rd, respectively. Frank Kreyer drove the truck at Martinsville, and drove again two races later at Mansfield with sponsorship from Culver's. Kreyer finished 28th at Martinsville, and 34th at Mansfield after engine problems. The team returned for one race in a start and park role in 2008 with Shepherd at Auto Club finishing 34th. The team returned in 2009, with the crew chief of the 40 truck, Lance Hooper, behind the wheel. Hooper raced the opening two races, finishing 35th at Daytona, and 36th at Auto Club in a start and park role.

Truck No. 44 results

References

8. http://pilotonline.com/sports/auto-racing/chesapeake-s-key-falk-ready-to-take-on-nascar-heavyweights/article_cc51bdd5-076c-509e-aaa2-97a04f15132d.html

External links
 
 

1993 establishments in North Carolina
American auto racing teams
Companies based in North Carolina
Defunct NASCAR teams